Błotnik  is a village in the administrative district of Gmina Cedry Wielkie, within Gdańsk County, Pomeranian Voivodeship, in northern Poland.

For details of the history of the region, see History of Pomerania.

The village has a population of 344.

History

Blotnik was formerly known as Schmerblock and was part of Kreis Danzig-Niederung during the existence of the Free City of Danzig (German: Freie Stadt Danzig; Polish: Wolne Miasto Gdańsk) in the period from 1919 to 1939 and part of Nazi Germany from 1939 - 1945

References

Villages in Gdańsk County